Charles Vinoth is an Indian actor who has appeared in Tamil language films as a supporting actor.

Career
After completing his education, Vinoth briefly began a career in shipping before losing passion in the area. Vinoth has since been a regular in the Chennai theatre scene, working with the production house Dr. Shoe Maker. Vinoth entered the film industry and received his breakthrough with roles in two consecutive film by Pa. Ranjith. His work as the antagonist in Madras (2014) won him a nomination for Vijay Award for Best Villain, while he was also cast alongside Rajinikanth in Kabali (2016). Away from work with Ranjith, Vinoth has also played negative characters Massu Engira Masilamani (2015) and Yeidhavan (2017).

Filmography

References

External links 

Living people
Male actors in Tamil cinema
21st-century Indian male actors
Tamil comedians
People from Tamil Nadu
1973 births